Ron Lemieux,  (born August 15, 1950) is a Canadian politician, who has been an elected member of the Legislative Assembly of Manitoba since 1999, and a former professional ice hockey player.

Born in Dauphin, Manitoba, Lemieux was an ice hockey defenceman and was selected by the Pittsburgh Penguins 110th overall in the 1970 NHL Amateur Draft. Lemieux started with the Dauphin Kings of the Manitoba Junior Hockey League, helping the Kings to the Manitoba championship in 1971-72.  He played for the Green Bay Bobcats in the United States Hockey League for the 1974-75 season (scoring seven goals and eighteen assists), but was never called up to the NHL. He later coached girls' hockey in Lorette, Manitoba and St. Adolphe.

After leaving hockey, Lemieux received a Bachelor of Arts in 1979 and a Bachelor of Education in 1985 from the University of Winnipeg. He completed post-baccalaureate work in education at the University of Manitoba. He worked as a teacher for several years, coaching various high school teams and holding positions in the teacher's association.

In the provincial election of 1999, Lemieux was elected to the Manitoba legislature for the rural riding of La Verendrye, defeating Progressive Conservative incumbent Ben Sveinson by 3533 votes to 3367.  Lemieux's victory was something of an upset, as it occurred in a riding which had never before been won by the New Democratic Party or its social-democratic predecessors (despite having existed since 1879).  In the 2003 election, Lemieux was re-elected with 58% of the riding's vote.

On October 5, 1999, Lemieux was appointed Minister of Consumer of Corporate Affairs, with responsibility for the Gaming Control Act.  He was relieved of the latter responsibility on July 4, 2000; after a cabinet shuffle on January 17, 2001, he was appointed Minister of Culture, Heritage and Tourism with responsibility for Sport.

Lemieux has since been "shuffled" two further times: he became Minister of Education and Youth on September 25, 2002, and Minister of Transportation and Government Services on November 4, 2003.

In September 2006 he was appointed Minister of Infrastructure and Transportation in Gary Doer's new cabinet.

In October 2013 Lemieux was named Minister of Tourism, Culture, Sport and Consumer Protection.

Lemieux has described his political views as being closer to Tony Blair's "New Labour" than to traditional democratic socialism. In 2003, he supported Bill Blaikie's campaign to become leader of the federal New Democratic Party. He was re-elected in the 2007 and 2011 provincial elections.

References

External links
 

1950 births
Canadian ice hockey defencemen
Dauphin Kings players
Franco-Manitoban people
Green Bay Bobcats players
Sportspeople from Dauphin, Manitoba
Living people
Members of the Executive Council of Manitoba
New Democratic Party of Manitoba MLAs
Pittsburgh Penguins draft picks
Canadian sportsperson-politicians
Ice hockey people from Manitoba
21st-century Canadian politicians